The Vernadsky National Library of Ukraine, VNLU is the main academic library and main scientific information centre in Ukraine, one of the world's largest national libraries. Its main building is located in the capital of the country – Kyiv, in the Demiivka neighborhood.

The library contains about 15 million items. The library has the most complete collection of Slavic writing, archives of outstanding world and Ukrainian scientists and cultural persons. The holdings include the collection of the presidents of Ukraine, archive copies of Ukrainian printed documents from 1917, and the archives of the National Academy of Sciences of Ukraine.

History 

The Vernadsky National Library of Ukraine was established on 2 August 1918 by Hetman Pavlo Skoropadskyi as the "National Library of the Ukrainian State" (Natsionalna biblioteka Ukrayinskoyi Derzhavy). On 23 August 1918 the Provisional Committee on creation of the National Library was established; it was headed by Vladimir Vernadsky (Volodymyr Vernadsky).

In August 1941 the library was evacuated to Ufa, the capital of Bashkortostan, where it was housed in the State pedagogical institute. In May 1944 the library returned to Kyiv.

The current building was constructed between 1975 and 1989. It has 27 floors and an area of 35,700 m. Its roof reaches 76.7 m and its antenna 78.6 m above ground. It was not until 1996 that the library received its National Library designation under its current name of Vernadsky National Library.

Since 1918, the Vernadsky National Library has undergone numerous name changes. See below for the various names and corresponding timeframes:

 National Library of the Ukrainian State (1918);
 National Library of Ukraine in Kyiv at the Ukrainian Academy of Sciences (1919);
 National Library of Ukraine at the All-Ukrainian Academy of Sciences in Kyiv (1919–1920);
 National Library of Ukraine in Kyiv (1920–1934);
 State Library of the All-Ukrainian Academy of Sciences (1934–1936);
 Library of the Academy of Sciences of the USSR (1936–1948);
 State Public Library of the Ukrainian SSR (1948–1965);
 Central Scientific Library of the USSR Academy of Sciences (1965–1988);
 Central Scientific Library named after VI Vernadsky Academy of Sciences of the USSR (1988–1996);
 VI Vernadsky National Library of Ukraine (since 1996).

Anti-Ukrainian Soviet repressions
A number of library directors were criticised in support of bourgeois nationalism or even executed as supporters of the "Petluravite fascist organization".
 1923–1929 Stepan Posternak; on 18 October 1929 he was arrested as a terrorist being a member of "Youth Academy", "Society in liberation of Ukraine" and "Fraternity of Ukrainian Statehood".

Holdings 
The collection of the Vernadsky National Library of Ukraine contains more than 15 million items. Its basis form the large book collections of the 18th to 19th centuries.

As a depository library the library has systematic acquisition. Annually, it receives 160,000 to 180,000 documents (books, magazines, newspapers, etc.). Holdings include all Ukrainian publications and copies of all Ukrainian candidate and doctoral theses. The library exchanges materials with more than 1,500 research and academic institutions and libraries from 80 countries. As a United Nations depository library since 1964, the library receives all English and Russian language publications from the United Nations and its special institutions.

The holdings of the Vernadsky National Library include large collections of manuscripts, rare printed books and incunabula. The library has the most complete collection of Slavic writing, including the Peresopnytsia Gospels, one of the most intricate surviving East Slavic manuscripts.

The Vernadsky National Library of Ukraine is the world's foremost repository of Jewish folk music recorded on Edison wax cylinders. Many of these were field recordings made during the Soviet or pre-Soviet era by ethnologists such as Susman Kiselgof, Moisei Beregovsky, and Sofia Magid. Their Collection of Jewish Musical Folklore (1912–1947) was inscribed on UNESCO's Memory of the World Register in 2005.

Collections

The library owns works related to the history and culture of Ukraine and surrounding regions, including some of the oldest and rarest documents in the country, including the only handwritten music composition in existence by Artemiĭ Vedel.

Orsha Gospel
The library holds the Orsha Gospel. The book, which dates back to the late 13th century, is one of the oldest Belaurisian and one of the oldest to depict Cyrillic script. The book was thrown away by a monastery in Orsha. It was found by Napoleon's troops in 1812. In 1874 it was donated to the Kyiv Theological Academy. It now resides in the collection of the National Library. It has miniature brightly colored illuminations of Saint Luke and Saint Matthew. They are in the Palaeologian dynasty style. Over 300 illustrations of flowers and animals are found in the book. It consists of the Gospel, a menology, and ends with matutinal gospels.

Aeneid

Ivan Kotliarevsky's epic poem version of the Aeneid, by Virgil, is the first piece of literature written in common Ukrainian. It was also the first book to discuss the culture and history of Ukraine. The library holds five first edition copies.

Collection highlights

References

External links 
 Vernadsky National Library of Ukraine – eCatalog

1918 establishments in Ukraine
Libraries established in 1918
Academic libraries in Ukraine
Ukraine
Deposit libraries
Libraries in Kyiv
Research institutes in Kyiv
Archives in Ukraine
National Academy of Sciences of Ukraine
NASU department of history, philosophy and law
World Digital Library partners
National libraries in Ukraine
Institutions with the title of National in Ukraine